Leon Lee Dorsey (born March 12, 1958) is an American jazz bassist, composer, arranger, producer, and educator known for his well-received debut for Landmark Records. He teaches at the Berklee School of Music in Boston.

Raised by a family plugged into Pittsburgh’s jazz lineage, Dorsey began playing instruments at an early age. He picked up the piano and cello first, soon after joining the Pittsburgh Symphony at the famed Center for the Musically Talented.

He began his undergraduate studies at Oberlin College, where he was the first to receive a B.M in classical Double Bass and Jazz Performance. Dorsey also graduated from the Oberlin Conservatory and was one of several jazz luminaries at the opening of their new jazz facility, the Bertram and Judith Kohl building.

He released his debut album The Watcher in 1995 and followed it up with 1999’s Song of Songs. In 2003, he founded Leon Lee Dorsey Studios in New York City.

Dorsey has performed alongside many jazz icons, from Lionel Hampton, Art Blakey & the Jazz Messengers, Dizzy Gillespie, Wynton Marsalis, Freddie Hubbard, John Lewis, Kenny Clarke, Jon Hendricks, Gloria Lynn, Harry “Sweets” Edison, Dorothy Donegan, Stanley Turrentine, George Benson, Ellis Marsalis, Nnenna Freelon, Terumasa Hino to GRAMMY-winning vocalist Cassandra Wilson, performing with Frank Sinatra at Carnegie Hall, and with conducting legends Lukas Foss and Robert Fountain.

Education 

 Classical Double Bass / Jazz Performance - Double Degree in Music (Oberlin College) - 1981
 Classical Double Bass - Master's Degree (University of Wisconsin-Madison) - 1983
 Artist Diploma Program (Hartt School of Music) - 1984
 Music Performance (Double Bass) - Master's Degree (Manhattan School of Music) - 1986
 Double Bass Performance - Doctor of Music (DMA) (Stony Brook University Graduate School) - 2016

Discography

As leader

As sideman

 I Get a Kick Out of Bu - Art Blakey & the Jazz Messengers
 1988: Feel the Wind - Art Blakey & the Jazz Messengers w/ Freddie Hubbard
 Cookin in the Kitchen - Lionel Hampton Orchestra
 Today's Love Songs Tomorrow's Blues - Arthur Prysock
 (Classical Chamber Music) - Manchester Festival Orchestra
 From my Heart to your Heart - Gloria Lynne w/ David "Fathead" Newman
 Darling Please Save your Love for Me - Dakota Stanton
 Gemini - Archie Schepp Quartet w/ John Hicks, Charlie Persip
 The Other Side - Oliver Lake, Big Band Live! w/John Stubblefield, Frank Lacy
 New York Story - Hilton Ruiz w/ George Coleman & Grady Tate
 Steppin’ with T.P. - Hilton Ruiz w/ Dave Valentin & Antonio Hart
 Swing ‘em Gates - Jay Hoggard w/ Dr. Billy Taylor, Winard Harper
 Twilight Blues - Roy Meriwether w/ Houston Pearson
 Song for my Sister - Roscoe Mitchell
 Renewal of the Spirit - Vincent Ector w/ Bobby Watson
 Lovecentric - Gerry Eastman w/ Joe Ford, Newman Baker
 Vignettes in the Spirit of Ellington - James Jabbo Ware
 Something is Coming - James Jabbo Ware
 Gilly’s Caper - Sue Terry w/ Saul Reuben, Vince Ector
 The Standard Session - Stephen Zinnato w/ Frank Wess, Charlie Persip
 The 5 A.M. Strut - Ezra Weiss w/ Billy Hart, Antonio Hart and Mike Mossman
 Persephone - Ezra Weiss w/ Billy Hart, Antonio Hart and Mike Mossman
 Miles Away…Wayne in Heavy - Eric Gould
 Who Sez - Eric Gould
 Great Spirit - Jim Finn
 Sax and the Single Girl - Gail Allen
 What is This Thing Called Jazz - Laura Theodore
 For Four Orchestras - Anthony Braxton (Oberlin Orchestra)
 The Daou – Columbia Records (Underground Dance-Rock)

External links
Dorsey's homepage from University of Pittsburgh
Dorsey's personal website

References

Landmark Records artists
Living people
1958 births
American jazz double-bassists
Male double-bassists
Oberlin College alumni
University of Pittsburgh faculty
21st-century double-bassists
21st-century American male musicians
American male jazz musicians